Live at St. Ann's Warehouse is a live album by singer-songwriter Aimee Mann.  It was released in 2004 by SuperEgo Records.  It is an album/DVD package, the CD being the album and the DVD being the concert film directed by Pierre Lamoureux. St. Ann's Warehouse is an arts venue in Brooklyn.

Track listing

CD 
"The Moth" – 3:46
"Sugarcoated" – 3:57
"Going Through the Motions" – 2:53
"Amateur" – 4:41
"Wise Up" – 3:21
"Save Me" – 4:43
"Stupid Thing" – 4:14
"That's Just What You Are" – 4:26
"Pavlov's Bell" – 4:34
"Long Shot" – 5:32
"4th of July" – 3:29
"King of the Jailhouse" – 5:41
"Deathly" – 7:03

DVD
"The Moth"
"Calling It Quits"
"Sugarcoated"
"Going Through The Motions"
"Humpty Dumpty"
"Amateur"
"Wise Up"
"Save Me"
"Stupid Thing"
"Pavlov's Bell"
"Long Shot"
"4th of July"
"Red Vines"
"Invisible Ink"
"King of the Jailhouse"
"Deathly"

Aimee Mann live albums
Live video albums
2004 live albums
2004 video albums
SuperEgo Records live albums
SuperEgo Records video albums
Aimee Mann video albums